Chicago Mercantile Exchange Center is an office complex of two towers in Chicago, Illinois, USA. They were completed in 1987 and have 40 floors. Fujikawa Johnson designed the buildings, which are the 87th tallest in Chicago.  "The Merc" is also known by its address, 30 South Wacker.

See also

List of tallest buildings in Chicago

References

Chicago Architecture

Skyscraper office buildings in Chicago
Office buildings completed in 1987
Twin towers
1987 establishments in Illinois